Sir Bernard Williams (1929–2003) was an English moral philosopher.

Bernard or Bernie Williams may also refer to:
Bernard Williams (priest) (1869–1943), English Anglican priest
Bernard Williams (footballer) (1908–2004), Irish footballer
Bernard Williams (producer) (1942–2015), British film producer and production manager
Bernie Williams (basketball) (1945–2002), American basketball player
Bernie Williams (1970s outfielder) (born 1948), American National League baseball outfielder
Bernie Williams (born 1968), American League baseball outfielder
Bernard Williams (gridiron football) (born 1972), American-born Canadian Football League player
Bernard Williams (sprinter) (born 1978), American athlete